Nalini Venkatasubramanian is a Professor of Computer Science in the Donald Bren School of Information and Computer Sciences at the University of California, Irvine. She is known for her work in effective management and utilization of resources in the evolving global information infrastructure. 
Her research interests are Multimedia Computing, Networked and Distributed Systems, Internet technologies and Applications, Ubiquitous Computing and Urban Crisis Responses. Dr. Venkatasubramanian's research focuses on enabling effective management and utilization of resources in the evolving global information infrastructure. She also addresses the problem of composing resource management services in distributed systems.

Born and raised in Bangalore, she received her Ph.D. in computer science from the University of Illinois, Urbana-Champaign in 1998. From 1991 to 1998, she was a member of technical staff and software designer engineer for Hewlett-Packard. In 1998, she joined UC Irvine as an Assistant Professor of Computer Science.

Awards
 NSF (National Science Foundation) Career Award, 1999. Networking Research Program.
 Teaching Excellence Award, Division of Undergraduate Education, 2002, University of California, Irvine
 Best Paper Award, IEEE Consumer Communications and Networking (CCN) Conference, Las Vegas, Jan 8th - 10th, 2006.
 Deans Award for Undergraduate Teaching, University of California, Irvine, 2014

References

External links
 

American computer scientists
Year of birth missing (living people)
Living people
Indian emigrants to the United States
University of California, Irvine faculty
University of Illinois alumni
People from Irvine, California
Kannada people
American women computer scientists
21st-century American women